Kanadi Budruk is a small village situated in the Ashti tehsil of the Beed district of Maharashtra. The population of the Kanadi Budruk is approximately 1800 as per latest census in 2011. The main occupation in the village is agriculture.

Pandurang Devastan in West Side of Village by Tustee Narendra Kulkarni Since Hereditary

Villages in Beed district